Delta DMD, a subsidiary company of Delta Holding, is an importer and wholesaler of food and beauty products with headquarters in Belgrade, Serbia. It is also operating in neighboring Montenegro. It was founded in 1997, and has around 340 employees.

In cooperation with the company Beiersdorf, for which Delta DMD is the exclusive distributor, it imports and distributes Nivea face and body care products, as well as Hansaplast products. In the sphere of foodstuffs Delta M operates as general importer and distributor of Ferrero confectionery in the territory of Serbia. The sales program of this sector includes the products of Perfetti Van Melle, Buitoni, Danone and Unilever.

References

External links
 

Companies based in Belgrade
Companies established in 1997
Delta Holding
D.o.o. companies in Serbia